The Almanach de Bruxelles is a now defunct French social register that listed royal and noble dynasties of Europe. It was established in 1918 during the First World War to compete against the prominent German Almanach de Gotha.

See also
 Almanach de Gotha

Sources

External links
Almanach de Bruxelles (1918- at WorldCat

Genealogy publications
Directories
Biographical dictionaries
Defunct periodicals published in France
European nobility
French royalty
1918 establishments in France
Publications established in 1918